The very first USS Hatteras was a 1,126-ton iron-hulled steamer purchased by the Union Navy at the beginning of the American Civil War. She was outfitted as a gunboat and assigned to the Union blockade of the ports and waterways of the Confederate States of America. During an engagement with the disguised Confederate commerce raider, CSS Alabama, she was taken by surprise and was sunk off the coast of Galveston, Texas. The wreck site is one of the few listed on the National Register of Historic Places because of its location away from destructive surf and because of the ship's side-wheel design, which marks the transition between wooden sailing ships and steam-powered ships.

Hatteras (formerly St. Mary) was purchased by the U. S. Navy from Harlan and Hollingsworth of Wilmington, Delaware on 25 September 1861. She was fitted out at the Philadelphia Navy Yard and commissioned in October 1861, Commander George F. Emmons in command.

Civil War service

Hatteras sailed for Key West, Florida on 5 November 1861, arriving there on 13 November to join the South Atlantic Blockading Squadron to choke off the South's economic lifeline as part of president Lincoln's Anaconda Plan. After blockade duty off Apalachicola, Florida, she was reassigned to Cedar Key, Florida, reaching there on 7 January 1862. Nine days later, Hatteras made a highly successful raid on the Cedar Keys harbor, burning seven small would-be blockade runners loaded with turpentine and cotton at the Florida Railroad wharf (an important Southern railroad terminus), several flat-cars, and various buildings.

To cap this day's work, Hatteras also captured 14 of the 22-man garrison stationed there, including their commanding officer. Such unceasing attack from the sea on any point along her long coastline and inland waterways cost the South dearly in losses, economic disruption, and dispersion of defense strength.

After this exploit, Hatteras was transferred to the Gulf Blockading Squadron and arrived off Berwick, Louisiana on 26 January. The next day, she engaged CSS Mobile, but failed to do any serious damage when the light-draft ship withdrew to the safety of shallow water.

Nevertheless, the Gulf of Mexico proved to be a profitable hunting ground for Hatteras, as in less than a year, she captured seven blockade runners with assorted cargos of cotton, sugar, and other goods the South was desperately striving to export for gold or much needed trade goods. These captures netted Hatteras, among other things, some 534 bales of valuable cotton. Commander Emmons stationed four of his own men on board one prize ship,  the sloop Poody, and rechristened her Hatteras Jr., turning the erstwhile blockade runner into a unit of the Union's Gulf Blockading Squadron.

Other Confederate ships taken by Hatteras as prizes included: steamer Indian No. 2, schooner Magnolia, steamer Governor A. Mouton, schooner Sarah, sloop Elizabeth, and brig Josephine. The majority of these ships were captured off Vermilion Bay, Louisiana, as they ran toward either Havana, Cuba, or the Sabine River area of Texas.

However, her illustrious career was cut short in early 1863, not long after she was ordered to join the blockading squadron under Rear Admiral David Farragut, who was attempting to retake the key Texas port of Galveston. Under a new skipper, Commander Homer C. Blake, who had relieved Captain Emmons in November 1862, Hatteras joined Farragut's squadron off Galveston on 6 January 1863.

Encounter with the CSS Alabama

As the blockading fleet lay to off the coast near Galveston on the afternoon of 11 January 1863, a set of sails was sighted just over the horizon and Hatteras was ordered to give chase. She took off in pursuit of the unknown ship at about 15:00 (3:00 PM), and for the next four hours followed her as she ventured closer and closer to shore. Finally, as dusk was falling, Hatteras came within hailing distance of the square-rigged ship. Commander Blake demanded her identity. "Her Britannic Majaesty's Ship Petrel," came the reply. Still suspicious, Blake ordered one of Hatteras boats to inspect this "Britisher."

Scarcely had the longboat pulled away from Hatteras than a new reply to Blake's question rang through the night. "We are the CSS Alabama." With this, the famed Confederate raider commanded by Raphael Semmes struck the Union Jack the raider had been flying, raising the Confederate Stars and Bars, and began raking Hatteras with her heavy cannon.

But Hatteras had already been badly holed in two places and was on fire and beginning to sink. Captain Blake ordered the magazines flooded to prevent explosion and reluctantly fired a single bow gun, indicating surrender and a need for assistance. Alabama, promptly sent over her boats to help remove Hatteras''' crew and wounded, and the last boatload of men had barely pulled away when the Union blockader sank, some 45 minutes after the beginning of the action.

Of Hatteras crew of 126, two had been killed and five wounded. Six escaped back to the squadron in the boat originally sent out to board and investigate "HMS Petrel", and the remainder, including Captain Blake, were taken to Port Royal, Jamaica, and from there paroled back to the United States; Alabama suffered only two wounded.

Only Hatteras masts reached out of water, and from the topmast the U.S. Navy commissioning pennant was still waving in the breeze. Even after surrendering, she had not struck her colors.

Present day
Her steam engine and two iron paddle wheels remain on the ocean bottom. The wreck is monitored to ensure that it is not damaged by oil and gas development in the area.

The wreck of Hatteras is the property of the United States Navy, though the Texas Historical Commission, Texas A&M University at Galveston and the federal Minerals Management Service (now Bureau of Ocean Energy Management) cooperate in preserving the important historical site.

At one time, local treasure hunters filed suit claiming the right to salvage the ship, but the courts found in favor of the United States government, in one of the few times courts have ruled in favor of historic preservation of a shipwreck site versus commercial interests.

The Alabama Hills are named in honor of the CSS Alabama. 

See also

National Register of Historic Places listings in Galveston County, Texas
Union Navy
Confederate States Navy

References

Semmes, R., CSS, Commander. The Cruise of the Alabama and the Sumter, (Two Volumes in One), Carlton, Publisher, New York, 1864.
Semmes, Raphael, Admiral, CSN. Memoirs of Service Afloat During the War Between the States. Blue & Grey Press, 1987. .
Hearn, Chester G., Gray Raiders of the Sea. Louisiana State Press, 1996. .
Luraghi, Raimondo. A History of the Confederate Navy. U.S. Naval Institute Press, 1996. .
Still, Jr., William N.; Taylor, John M.; Delaney, Norman C., Raiders and Blockaders, the American Civil War Afloat. Brassy's, Inc., 1998. .

AttributionThis article contains public domain material from the Naval Historical Center.''

External links

USS Hatteras (1861–1863)
USS Hatteras: Site Monitoring and Mapping
NOAA Press Release on Hatteras Jan. 11, 2013
Sonar to give best view yet of Civil War shipwreck

Ships of the Union Navy
Steamships of the United States Navy
Gunboats of the United States Navy
American Civil War patrol vessels of the United States
National Register of Historic Places in Galveston County, Texas
Shipwrecks in the Gulf of Mexico
Shipwrecks of the Texas coast
Shipwrecks of the American Civil War
Shipwrecks on the National Register of Historic Places in Texas
Maritime incidents in January 1863
1861 ships
Ships built by Harlan and Hollingsworth